Talal Ali Silo (also transliterated Telal Silo, Talal Sallou) is a Syrian Turkmen military personnel who was the official Syrian Democratic Forces (SDF) spokesperson from 2014 until his surrender or defection to Turkey in November 2017, covering major SDF operations and battles against the militant group ISIL. His departure marked the first major defection among the SDF's top ranks.

During an interview, he alleged that during the SDF capture of Raqqa from ISIL, thousands of ISIL fighters—many more than first reported—left the city under a secret U.S.-approved deal. However, US officials described Silo's comments as “false and contrived”. The deal is argued as a strategic move by the SDF and coalition forces.
The US-backed Syrian Democratic Forces (SDF) and the Syrian National Army (SNA) have presented different versions of the reasons behind Silo's departure - reflecting the complexities of the Syrian Civil War.

See also 
 Seljuk Brigade
 Syrian Democratic Forces

References 

1965 births
Syrian Democratic Forces
Syrian defectors
Syrian colonels
Living people
People from Aleppo Governorate
Syrian Turkmen people